Simon Wing (1826 –1910) was a daguerreotypist and camera inventor and socialist politician. He is best remembered as the first candidate of the Socialist Labor Party of America for President of the United States, running for that office in 1892.

Biography

Simon Wing was born in Saint Albans Somerset County, Maine in 29 August 1826.

As a photographer and ferrotypist, he kept a studio on Washington Street in Boston.

Wing spent most of his life living in the town of Watertown, Massachusetts.

Political career

Wing was an active member of the Socialist Labor Party of America (SLP) and stood as its first nominee for President of the United States in 1892, heading a ticket with Brooklyn, New York electrician Charles H. Matchett. The SLP ran tickets in six states in that year, garnering a total vote of 21,512.

Death and legacy

Simon Wing died 17 December 1910 at his home in Charlestown, Massachusetts. He was 84 years old at the time of his death.

Footnotes

External links

 Flickr.com: Simon Wing "Little Gem" camera image
 

Socialist Labor Party of America politicians from Massachusetts
1827 births
1911 deaths
Photographers from Massachusetts
People from St. Albans, Maine
People from Watertown, Massachusetts
Socialist Labor Party of America presidential nominees
Candidates in the 1892 United States presidential election
19th-century American photographers